Chhakka Panja Franchise is a film franchise directed by Deepa Shree Niraula and is one of the biggest franchises of Nepali cinema. The first film was released in September 201, Chhakka Panja, broke every record in Nepali cinema and was the highest-grossing film in Nepal until Chhakka Panja 3 was released in 2018. The second installment arrived in August 2017 Chhakka Panja 2 which broke records but didn't become the highest-grossing film of Nepal and third installment named Chhakka Panja 3 arrived in October 2018 which broke every record in Nepal and became the highest grossing Nepali film of all time till 4 years until it was broken by another famous franchise film Kabaddi 4: The Final Match. Currently Chhakka Panja Franchise has total grossed more than 50 Crores first franchise to do so and followed by Kabaddi Franchise. Now Chhakka Panja 4 has broken all the previous record and become highest earning Nepali movie of all time. This time Chhakka Panja 4 songs (Chhakka Panja 4 - Promotional Song, Darshan Salam and Sirupate Jungama are also breaking the records and are trending in Youtube.

Casts
This table lists the main characters who appear in the Chhakka Panja Franchise

Release and Reception

References 

Film franchises
Nepalese comedy-drama films